Trachystola is a genus of longhorn beetles of the subfamily Lamiinae, containing the following species:

 Trachystola granulata Pascoe, 1862
 Trachystola scabripennis Pascoe, 1862

References

Lamiini